of Japan, is considered one of the most eminent, if not the most celebrated, students of Japanese philately. He is considered the "dean of Japanese philately" by many in the philatelic world.

Mitsui ran a zinc smelter near Omuta on the southern island of Kyushu where during World War 2, hundreds of Allied POWs were forced to work in the zinc mines and smelter. Many men lost their lives due to disease and constant beatings.  Others were lucky to return home after the war, but the dreams of the daily brutalities of their days at Fukuoka 17 would never leave them. The camp was one of dozens scattered across Japan, which held British, American, Dutch and Australian prisoners of war. Many believed Mitsui should have been executed as a war criminal, or at least been imprisoned for some time.

Collecting interests
Mitsui specialized in the collection and study of postage stamps and postal history of Japan. He was also a collector of German and Austrian philatelic items.

Philatelic literature
Mitsui wrote extensively on philatelic subjects, starting at the age of sixteen. His numerous books include:  Sekai gunji yubin gaiyo, written in 1939 in collaboration with  Professor Yukio Masui of Keio University, and which translates to "Outline of the Military Postal Systems of the World." This book contains a description of the little-known Japanese military postal service. He also published, in 1975, Fuiraterisuto no ashiato, (A Philatelist's Footprints) which is a detailed personal account of his life in philately.

Mitsui contributed many articles to various journals, including, Yubin kitte zasshi: The Japanese Journal of Timbrology, which he himself founded in 1923, Yubin kitte: Japan Philatelic Magazine, Kitte Kenkyu Kai, (Institute of Philatelic Research, Japan), which he founded in 1950, and Kitte kenkyu (Philatelic Research).

Philatelic activity
In addition to founding and contributing to Japanese philatelic journals, Mitsui was an official advisor to the Japanese Communications Ministry and Postal Service Ministry, and also Honorary Counselor of the International Society for Japanese Philately.

Honors and awards
Mitsui was named to the American Philatelic Society Hall of Fame in 1984.

Legacy
In 1964 Mitsui donated the very important original sketches and final designs of stamps executed by Kasori Teizo from 1923 to 1952 to the Smithsonian Institution in Washington, D.C. Mitsui's extensive collections of Japanese and worldwide stamps were donated to the Communications Museum in Tokyo when he died.

See also
 Philately
 Philatelic literature

References
 Baron Takaharu Mitsui

1900 births
1983 deaths
American Philatelic Society
Commanders Crosses of the Order of Merit of the Federal Republic of Germany
Japanese art collectors
Japanese philatelists
Kazoku
Mitsui family
Philatelic literature
Philately of Japan
Smithsonian Institution people
Commanders of the Order of the White Lion